Frinton and Walton is a civil parish in the Tendring district of Essex, England.

It is a successor parish, established in 1974 to replace the Frinton and Walton Urban District. The parish council was created to replace Frinton and Walton Urban District Council at the same time.

The previously separate parishes of Frinton, Great Holland, Kirby le Soken and Walton le Soken had been combined in 1934 as part of a Local Government Act 1929 review to form a new parish and urban district of Frinton and Walton.

It had a population of 19,039 according to the 2001 census, reducing to 18,845 at the 2011 census.  The parish consists of the towns of Frinton-on-Sea and Walton-on-the-Naze, together with the villages of Kirby-le-Soken, Kirby Cross and Great Holland.

References

External links
 Unofficial Frinton on sea website
 A Vision of Britain Through Time: Walton and Frinton

Civil parishes in Essex
Tendring
Populated coastal places in Essex